The 2007 England rugby union tour of South Africa was a series of matches played in May and June 2007 in South Africa by England national rugby union team to prepare for the 2007 Rugby World Cup.

In both tests, the team, coached by Brian Ashton lost heavily against the future world cup winners. Many injured players remained at home, and it was therefore not possible for England to provide a strong opposition to the Springboks.

First test

Second Test

References

2007 rugby union tours
2006–07 in English rugby union
2007
2007 in South African rugby union